Ioanna Bouziou (born 14 May 1973) is a Greek softball player. She competed in the women's tournament at the 2004 Summer Olympics.

References

1973 births
Living people
Greek softball players
Olympic softball players of Greece
Softball players at the 2004 Summer Olympics
Sportspeople from Piraeus